The 2020–21 season was Al-Shabab's 44th non-consecutive season in the top flight of Saudi football and 74th year in existence as a football club. The club participated in the Pro League, the King Cup and the Arab Club Champions Cup.

The season covered the period from 22 September 2020 to 30 June 2021.

Players

Squad information

Out on loan

Transfers and loans

Transfers in

Loans in

Transfers out

Loans out

Pre-season

Competitions

Overview

Goalscorers

Last Updated: 30 May 2021

Assists

Last Updated: 30 May 2021

Clean sheets

Last Updated: 30 May 2021

References

Al Shabab FC (Riyadh) seasons
Shabab